Yun Mi-kyung (born October 14, 1980) is a South Korean manhwa artist best known for her work Bride of the Water God.

Career 
Yun received the silver medal in the New Artist Debut Competition for her work Na-eu Ji-gu Bang-moon-gi (The Journey of my Earth Visit) in 2003.

She received a Best New Artist award from the Dokja Manhwa prize organization for Railroad in 2004.

Currently working on Bride of the Water God in the magazine Wink.

Works
A Cat that Loved a Fish
Railroad
Bride of the Water God

References

1980 births
South Korean manhwa artists
South Korean manhwa writers
Living people
South Korean female comics artists
South Korean women artists
Female comics writers